The first sequences of keratins revealed that keratins could be grouped into two categories based on their sequence homologies. These two groups of keratins were named as type I and type II keratins. These two categories also represent the first two categories of the superfamily of intermediate filament proteins.

Keratins in this table are classified in the first two columns according to the nomenclature established in 2006. Other names previously used are listed in columns 3 and 4.

Type I keratins

Human epithelial keratins

Human hair keratins

Nonhuman hair/epithelial keratins

Human keratin pseudogenes

Type II keratins

Human epithelial keratin

Human hair keratins

Human keratin pseudogenes

See also

 Keratins
 Skin
 Epidermis

References

Skin anatomy
Keratins